Poland competed at the 2003 World Championships in Athletics in Paris, France, from 23 – 21 August 2003.

Medalists

Sources 

Nations at the 2003 World Championships in Athletics
World Championships in Athletics
Poland at the World Championships in Athletics